Tillandsia andreana is a species of flowering plant in the family Bromeliaceae, native to Colombia and north-west Venezuela. It was first described in 1888.

References

andreana
Flora of Colombia
Flora of Venezuela
Plants described in 1888